Argiope anasuja, is a species of harmless orb-weaver spider (family Araneidae) found from the Seychelles to India, Pakistan and Sri Lanka, and in the Maldives.

Description
Female is about 8-12 mm long and male is 3.5-4.5 mm. After Cephalothorax greyish brown with hairs. Sternum heart shaped with hairy pubescent white patch. Palps bear spines. Legs greyish brown and hairy. Femora dorsally yellowish. Abdomen pentagonal and hairy. Dorsum yellowish with brown transverse bands. Three sigilla pairs distinct. Ventrum dark brownish with two longitudinal white patches.

Ecology
Like other species of the same genus, it is known as a "signature spider"; it builds a web with a zig-zag stabilimentum somewhat resembling letters. The mature female of A. anasuja always rests at the centre of the orb with her head facing downwards. The orb has an opening at the centre and when disturbed she goes through the hole and exits on the other side of the plane of the web.

They are commonly found on flora of Mimosaceae family. They prefer to make the web in a plane of shadow in the daylight.

Reproduction
Male is smaller than female. Male spins a web around the female's web, which is known as a companion web. After the mating, as in other common spiders, female kill the male. Female lay eggs on the companion web and wrap them up into a sac. Spiderlings eat each other in the sac until the strongest spiderling break the sac wall. The sac can hold from 400 to 1,400 eggs.

References

Fauna of Pakistan
ansuja
Spiders of Asia
Spiders described in 1887